Shahla Lahiji (born 1942) is an Iranian writer, publisher, translator, women's rights activist, and the director of Roshangaran, a publishing house on women's issues.

Career and activities
Lahiji completed a degree in sociology at the Open University of London. She established Roshangaran publishing house in 1983, becoming the first female publisher in Iran. As of 2006 Roshangaran published more than 200 titles which are produced by female authors or which are concerned with women's issues. The publishing house received the PEN International prize in the United States and the Pandora prize in the United Kingdom in 2001.

She was one of 19 writers and intellectuals prosecuted for participating in an academic and cultural conference sponsored by the Heinrich Böll Foundation in Berlin on 7–9 April 2000 at which political and social reform in Iran were publicly debated.
Before being released on bail in June 2000, Lahiji was kept in Evin Prison and interrogated for several months without access to an attorney. Six of the 19 intellectuals charged in connection with the Berlin conference were acquitted, while 11 were sentenced to prison terms ranging from four to fourteen years, however several, such as notable cleric and writer Hasan Yousefi Eshkevari, have since been released. Shahla Lahiji had been sentenced to three years and six months in prison for interfering with national security by attending the conference, plus another six months for spreading propaganda against the Islamic Republic by speaking out about the dangers facing Iranian writers. Her sentence was eventually shortened to six months.

Books
 The Quest for Identity : The Image of Iranian Women in Prehistory and History, co-authored with Mehrangiz Kar, 1992
 Iran Awakening: One Woman's Journey to Reclaim Her Life and Country, co-authored with Azadeh Moaveni, 2007
 Quello che mi spetta by Parinoush Saniee, (Contributor), 2010(first published in 2002)

Other publications 
 Lahiji, ShahlaScarecrow Press, Inc 2013.

Honours and awards
 2001 PEN/Barbara Goldsmith Freedom to Write Award
 2006 IPA Publishers' Freedom Prize
21 September 2006, Geneva (Switzerland) and Göteborg (Sweden) – Iranian publisher Shahla Lahiji will receive the first IPA Publishers' Freedom Prize today at the Göteborg Book Fair's opening ceremony, in recognition of her extraordinary defense and promotion of freedom of expression and freedom to publish in her country and globally.
Shahla Lahiji was chosen as the prize-winner by the board of the International Publishers' Association (IPA) from among many deserving candidates nominated by IPA members, independent publishers, and human rights organizations.

See also
 Shirin Ebadi
 Mehrangiz Kar
 Shahla Sherkat

References

External links
 Hajir Palaschi, "Interview with Shahla Lahiji on Women's Presence in the Labor Market: No Vocation Must Be Prohibited for Women"
 Shahla Lahiji's 2006 award
 Shahla Lahiji- anvari.org
 Tehran's Women Cultural Center Holds Ceremony in honor of Shahla Lahiji
 Roshangaran website
 Shahla_Lahiji's list of publications 
 Shahla Lahiji's prosecution
 Interview with Shahla Lahiji on Women’s Presence in the Labor Market: No Vocation Must Be Prohibited for Women

1942 births
Living people
Iranian writers
Iranian women's rights activists
Iranian women writers